Associació Esportiva Prat is a Spanish football team based in El Prat de Llobregat, in the autonomous community of Catalonia. Founded in 1945 it plays in Segunda División RFEF – Group 3, holding home games at Estadi Sagnier, with a 500-seat capacity.

History 
The club was founded on 7 February 1945 as Agrupación Deportiva Prat. Josep Aleu Torres became its first president.

Season to season

5 seasons in Segunda División B
1 season in Segunda División RFEF
14 seasons in Tercera División

Honours
Tercera División: 2011–12, 2015–16

Players

Current squad

Out on loan

References

External links
Official website (archived 12 September 2011)
AE Prat at Futbolme 

 
Football clubs in Catalonia
Association football clubs established in 1945
1945 establishments in Spain
El Prat de Llobregat